is a Japanese women's professional shogi player ranked 2-dan.

Promotion history
Katō's promotion history is as follows:

 3-kyū: February 1, 2018
 2-kyū: June 21. 2018
 1-kyū: October 1, 2019
 1-dan: March 16, 2020
 2-dan: April 2, 2021

Note: All ranks are women's professional ranks.

References

External links
 ShogiHub: Kato, Kei

Japanese shogi players
Living people
Women's professional shogi players
Professional shogi players from Ibaraki Prefecture
1991 births
People from Hitachi, Ibaraki